Rakiyah Nadia Wright (born November 27, 1992), known professionally as Rakiyah (Ruh-KAH-EE-yuh), is an American R&B singer-songwriter and producer. In 2020 she released her first official Korean-English song “Like You”  and her R&B EP, Into the Cosmos, in 2021.

Early life

Rakiyah Nadia Wright, hereafter Rakiyah, was born on November 27, 1992, in Montclair, New Jersey and is of African-American descent. She spent her early childhood years living in Vance, South Carolina and later, moved with her family to East Orange, New Jersey. Despite her early interest in mathematics and the sciences, Rakiyah developed a strong passion for the arts. This led her to take contemporary dance and ballet lessons throughout middle school and high school. Rakiyah attended the New Jersey Institute of Technology in Newark, New Jersey, where she studied as an Industrial Engineer Undergraduate. During her early post-secondary studies, Rakiyah developed an interest in the Korean language after a coworker introduced her to Boys Over Flowers, a popular Korean drama.

In 2016, Rakiyah created her first YouTube channel Rakiyah In Space (FKA LetsTalkKorean) in order to share her Korean study tips and learning journey. Soon after the creation of her channel, Rakiyah received multiple scholarships in February 2017 to study abroad as an exchange student for an academic semester at Hanyang University, in Seoul, South Korea.

She attended Hanyang University for a second time from September 2018 to June 2019. During her second time abroad, Rakiyah gained her professional experience at Lockheed Martin Aeronautics as a Quality Engineer and Aeronautical Engineer for Structural Analysis and Design. However, she later decided to pursue a career in music instead.

Musical career

2018–2019: Career beginnings and Alter Ego EP 

Rakiyah was first introduced to singing and songwriting in 2016 when a college friend noticed her vocal talents and suggested that she should actively pursue a career in music. This ultimately led her to release her first EP, Alter Ego, in 2018 under the stage name Rakiyah Nadia, with her titled song, “Cruise Control”. In the following year, Rakiyah recorded her second EP, Mango Tree, and third EP, HIM, while studying abroad in South Korea.By the end of 2019, she decided to change her stage name from Rakiyah Nadia to the mononym Rakiyah, which is reflected in her recent work.

2020–present: Like You Single and Into The Cosmos EP 

Rakiyah first used her Korean language skills with her first English/Korean R&B single, "Like You", on October 23, 2020. She later released a dance video as a companion for the song. The following year, Rakiyah released her highly anticipated EP Into The Cosmos on January 5, 2021. This EP showcased her second English/Korean song, “The Invitation”, which featured J.cob, a Korean R&B artist. Her latest single, Naughty X Nature (Naughty by Nature), which released on June 18, 2021, teased her alter ego for her upcoming album, The Cosmic Queen.

While pursuing her solo music career, Rakiyah has also started the pursuit as a professional songwriter for various Western and Asian artists and groups.

Artistry

Rakiyah is known for dabbling in multiple genres, including Alternative and Contemporary R&B, Neo-Soul, and Hip-Hop, making her own signature sound. Her early inspirations stemmed from singer-songwriters Erykah Badu, Donna Summer, Janet Jackson and female rappers and musicians Lauren Hill, Left Eye, and Eve. This led Rakiyah to create her own unique, experiential sound in the R&B genre. Her fans would agree, often describing her vocals as “celestial, soothing, and whimsical”. What also makes Rakiyah unique is her occasional use of Korean lyricism that can be heard in both “Like You” and “The Invitation”.

Discography

Singles

Q.T (2019)

I.T.I.D (2020)

Like You (2020)

Naughty X Naughty (2021)

1-800-MLKYWAY ft. DaVionne (2022)

Lay U Down Again (2022)

EPs

Alter Ego (2018)

Mango Tree (2019)

Him (2019)

Into The Cosmos (2021)

The Cosmic Queen (TBD)

As featured artist

Hard to Breathe by J.cob

References

External links
 Official website

American women singers
Living people
American contemporary R&B singers
21st-century American women
1992 births